St Albert's Catholic Chaplaincy is the Roman Catholic chaplaincy for the University of Edinburgh. It started in 1931, when the Dominican Order moved into the house. It is located at 23 and 24 George Square, south of the city centre, and north of The Meadows. The original building is category A listed and the chapel, built in 2012, won an award for architectural excellence from the Royal Institute of British Architects.

History

Foundation
The original building was designed in 1766. It was built between 1766 and 1779, as part of the construction of George Square. According to Historic Environment Scotland, "George Square was the earliest, largest and most ambitious scheme of unified town planning attempted in Edinburgh to date." The building was designed by James Brown (1729-1807), brother of George Brown the Laird of Elliston and Lindsaylands, who the square is named after.

The first resident at 23 George Square was Thomas Lockhart. During the nineteenth century Arthur Conan Doyle stayed there as a medical student and in the twentieth century, Patrick Nuttgens resided there. 24 George Street, for many decades housed officers of the East India Company. In 1931 it was bought by the Dominican Order, who were then invited to be the chaplains to the Catholic community at the University of Edinburgh. The drawing room in the house was converted into the first chapel.

New chapel
In the 2000s, the chaplaincy needed a chapel with increased capacity. In July 2012, the new chapel, built in the garden, was completed and opened. It was the first new Dominican chapel in Scotland since the Reformation. It was designed by Stuart Allan, of the architectural firm Simpson & Brown. It has a capacity of 150 people and the window behind the altar has a clear view of the garden.

In 2013, the new chapel received architectural awards and recognition from the Scottish Civic Trust, the Royal Incorporation of Architects in Scotland, and the Royal Institute of British Architects.

Chapel

See also
 Archdiocese of St Andrews and Edinburgh

References

External links
 
 

Category A listed buildings in Edinburgh
Dominican churches in the United Kingdom
Roman Catholic churches in Edinburgh
Religious organizations established in 1931
University and college chapels in the United Kingdom
Modernist architecture in Scotland
Roman Catholic chapels in Scotland
Listed churches in Edinburgh